David Harvey (born 1935) is a geographer and social theorist.

David Harvey may also refer to:

David Harvey (footballer) (born 1948), former goalkeeper for Leeds United and Scotland
David Harvey (luthier), American luthier
David Harvey (jurist), New Zealand judge and legal writer
David Harvey (producer), American music producer who won the 1975 Grammy Award for Best Classical Album
David Harvey (rugby union) (born 1982), Australian rugby union player
David Harvey (television), television presenter and executive
David Harvey (paediatrician) (1936–2010), British paediatrician
David Charles Harvey (1946–2004), English author
David Archibald Harvey (1845–1916), U.S. House Delegate from Oklahoma Territory
David Alan Harvey (born 1944), American photographer
David Harvey (structural engineer) (born 1947), British structural engineer
D. W. Harvey (David William Harvey, 1887–1938), Canadian engineer

See also
 Harvey (disambiguation)
 David (disambiguation)